Filip Mangen Ingebrigtsen (born 20 April 1993) is a Norwegian middle distance runner who represents Sandnes Idrettslag. In 2016, Ingebrigtsen became European Champion at 1500 meters during the European Championships in Amsterdam, and took bronze over the same distance at the World Championships in 2017 in London. He previously held the Norwegian 1500m record with the time 3:30.01, set at a Diamond League meet in Monaco on 20 July 2018.  At the 2019 London Diamond League Ingebrigtsen finished second to Samuel Tefera in the mile. With a time of 3:49.60 Ingebrigtsen ran a national record and new personal best.

Ingebrigtsen was born in Sandnes. His older brother Henrik Ingebrigtsen and younger brother Jakob Ingebrigtsen (born 2000) are also middle distance runners and European champions at 1500 meters. They are trained by their dad Gjert Ingebrigtsen.

Career
2011 Season:

At the Norwegian Championship  2011 he finished fifth in the 800 meters with time 1.56.18. At the same meeting, he also was on the Sandnes Idrettslag team that won gold in the junior class. The others on the team were Kjartan Løvoll, Per Magne Florvaag and Marius Bakken Støle. In the terrain race he received NM medal, and won silver in the short run in NM in terrain race. In the long run (6 km) he finished fifth, and also got bronze in the relay, together with teammates Asle Rønning Tjelta and Ragnar Stølsmark.

2012-2015 Seasons:

In July 2012 he won gold at 1500 meters in junior NM in athletics in Sigdal. In August he finished third at 800 meters in the 2012 Norwegian Athletics Championships, with Thomas Roth winning and older brother Henrik finishing second. In the 2013 Norwegian Athletics Championship he won the 1500 meters, and also won gold on the 4 × 1500 meter relay in the NM.

At the 2014 European Athletics Championships, where he ran 3.41.06 for 1500 meters in the opening session, but did not reach the final.  The following week he won  two medals in the Norwegian Championship, coming  second in the 1500 meters and third at 800 meters.

In the 2015 European Athletics Championships finished second in the 1500 meters behind Snorre Holtan Løken.

2016 Season:

In the 2016 European Athletics Championships, he won the 1500 meters, with his older brother Henrik in third place. The week after, at the Diamond League meet in Monaco, and lowered his personal 1500 meters record to 3:33.72, finishing in 10th place. Ingebrigtsen represented Norway during the Rio Olympics in August, but was disqualified during the trial heat of the 1500 meters.

2017 Season:

In the 2017 World Championships in Athletics, Ingebrigtsen took the bronze medal at 1500 meters with time 3.34.53.

2018 Season:

At  the Diamond League in Monaco on 20 July 2018 Ingebrigtsen set a record of 1500 meters with a time of 3:30.01, which was the best time in Europe that year, and he became a favorite at that distance for  the European Championship in Berlin. In the semi-finals, he fell and broke a rib, but got up, took the field again and qualified for the final. His injury affected his performance in the final, and he also had to withdraw from the 5000 meters final. His younger brother Jakob took gold at both distances, and his older brother Henrik took the silver at 5000 meters. The injury also troubled Ingebrigtsen during the NM a few weeks later, but he won the silver medal at 800 meters behind Thomas Roth.

2019 Season:

Some of Ingebrigtsen's performances during the 2019 season were controversial. In the 2019 European Athletics Indoor Championships, he was disqualified in his 1500 meters heat for running off the track. His brother Jakob remarked that "It was the stupidest thing I'll see all year". A few months later, at the 2019 World Athletics Championships, Ingebrigtsen was seen to push another runner, Tedesse Lemi, causing him to fall, but he was not disqualified and proceeded to the semifinals.

2020 Season:

At the Millrose Games, Ingebrigtsen ran a 3:56.99 indoor mile to set a new national record. He also set personal bests in the 1500 meters (3:36.32) and 800 meters (1:49.56). Ingebrigtsen opened his outdoor season in the Impossible Games, running the 1000 meters in a national record of 2:16.46 and a 2000 meters in 4:56.91 just behind his brothers Henrik (4:53.72) and Jakob (4:50.01), running both events on the same day. He ran an 800 meter personal best of 1:46.74 3 weeks later. In August, Ingebrigtsen ran the 1500 meters at the Monaco Diamond League in 3:30.35 season best.

2021 Season:

Ingebrigtsen's 2021-2022 season was placed into jeopardy due to a reaction to receiving the Covid-19 vaccine but said that he would do it again. He struggled in training leading up to the 2020 Summer Olympics and failed to qualify for the Olympic Men's 1500 m final after finishing tenth in his heat.

International competitions

1Did not finish in the final

References

External links
 
 
 
 
 

1993 births
Living people
People from Sandnes
Norwegian male middle-distance runners
Norwegian male cross country runners
Olympic athletes of Norway
Athletes (track and field) at the 2016 Summer Olympics
World Athletics Championships athletes for Norway
World Athletics Championships medalists
European Athletics Championships medalists
Norwegian Athletics Championships winners
Ingebrigtsen family
European Cross Country Championships winners
Athletes (track and field) at the 2020 Summer Olympics
Sportspeople from Rogaland